Lars-Göran Åslund (born June 7, 1945 in Åsarna). is a former Swedish cross-country skier who competed in the late 1960s and early 1970s. His biggest success was at the 1970 FIS Nordic World Ski Championships in Vysoké Tatry where he won two medals with a gold in the 15 km and a bronze in the 4 × 10 km relay. He also competed at the 1972 Winter Olympics.

Cross-country skiing results
All results are sourced from the International Ski Federation (FIS).

Olympic Games

World Championships
 2 medals – (1 gold, 1 bronze)

References

External links

 

1945 births
Living people
People from Berg Municipality
Cross-country skiers from Jämtland County
Swedish male cross-country skiers
FIS Nordic World Ski Championships medalists in cross-country skiing
Olympic cross-country skiers of Sweden
Cross-country skiers at the 1972 Winter Olympics